Michael Williams, FBA (1935–2009) was a Welsh historical geographer, known particularly for his work on deforestation. He had a personal chair at the University of Oxford from 1996.

Life
He was the second son of Benjamin Williams and his wife, Ethel Mary Marshell of Swansea, born in Rheanfa House Maternity Hospital. He studied at University College, Swansea from 1953, and fell under the influence of the geographer Frank Emery. He graduated B.A.
in 1956, and Ph.D. in 1960 with a thesis on the Somerset Levels. By that time married, he moved on to St Catharine's College, Cambridge, working for an education diploma.

Later in 1960, Williams took a lecturing post at the University of Adelaide, becoming reader in 1970. In 1978 he went to the University of Oxford, where he was a reader from 1990, professor from 1996, and a Fellow of Oriel College. He was elected a fellow of the British Academy in 1989.

Professor emeritus from 2002, Williams died of adult respiratory distress syndrome on 26 October 2009.

Works
Williams's books included:

The Draining of the Somerset Levels (1970)
The Making of the South Australian Landscape (1976)
The Changing Rural Landscape of South Australia (1977)
Americans and their Forests (1989), Charles A. Weyerhaeuser Book Award of the American Forest and Conservation Society
Deforesting the Earth, from Prehistory to Global Crisis (2003), Weyerhaeuser Book Award and Meridian Prize of the Association of American Geographers.

Notes

1935 births
2009 deaths
Welsh geographers
Fellows of Oriel College, Oxford
Historical geographers
Environmental historians
Fellows of the British Academy